The Wheeler County School District is a public school district in Wheeler County, Georgia, United States, based in Alamo. It serves the communities of Alamo, Glenwood, Helena, and Scotland.

Schools
The Wheeler County School District has one elementary school and one middle-high school.

Elementary schools
Wheeler County Elementary School

Middle-high school
Wheeler County High School

References

External links

School districts in Georgia (U.S. state)
Education in Wheeler County, Georgia